Jimmy B, born Jimmy Bangura, is a Sierra Leonean musician, filmmaker, producer and entertainer. He has been called the "Godfather of Sierra Leone music".

Life
Jimmy B acted in the Eddie Murphy's 1988' romantic comedy Coming to America before moving to South Africa, setting up a music studio there and achieving success as a musician. After the end of the Sierra Leone Civil War in 2002, Jimmy B facilitated the release of several hip hop albums and compilations from Paradise Studio.

In 2014 Bangura privately funded Ebola 4 Go, a video educating people about ebola. He has presented The Jimmy B Show, a radio show on Freetown's AiRadio which  specializes in Sierra Leonean music.

In 2019 his teenage son drowned in the United States of America.

Films
 Paradise Island, 2009
 Guardian of the Throne, 2014
 A Stitch in Time, 2014
 The British Expert, 2019

References

External links
 

Year of birth missing (living people)
Living people
Sierra Leonean musicians
Sierra Leonean film directors